Baharampur Assembly constituency is an assembly constituency in Murshidabad district in the Indian state of West Bengal.

Overview
As per orders of the Delimitation Commission, No. 72 Baharampur Assembly constituency covers Baharampur municipality, and Bhakuri I, Daulatabad, Gurudaspur, Hatinagar and Manindranagar gram panchayats of Berhampore community development block.

Baharampur Assembly constituency is part of No. 10 Baharampur (Lok Sabha constituency).

Members of Legislative Assembly

Election results

2016
In the 2016 election, Manoj Chakraborty of Congress defeated his nearest rival Sujata Banerjee of Trinamool Congress.

.# Swing calculated on Congress+Trinamool Congress vote percentages taken together in 2011.

2011
In the 2011 election, Manoj Chakraborty of Congress defeated his nearest rival Tarit Brahmachari of RSP.

.# Swing calculated on Congress+Trinamool Congress vote percentages taken together in 2011.

2006
In the 2006 election, Manoj Chakraborty of Congress MP of Baharampur, Adhir Ranjan Chowdhury Supported Independent defeated his nearest rival Amal Karmakar of RSP.

.# Swing calculated on Congress+Manoj Chakraborty (Independent) vote percentages taken together in 2006.

1977–2006
In the 2006 state assembly elections Manoj Chakraborty, Independent, won the Berhampore assembly seat defeating his nearest rival Amal Karmakar of RSP. Manoj Chakraborty, contesting as an independent, was a rebel congress candidate put up by Adhir Choudhury as a protest against the official Congress candidate Maya Rani Paul. He was subsequently taken back into the Congress. Contests in most years were multi cornered but only winners and runners are being mentioned. Maya Rani Paul of Congress defeated Kartick Sahana of RSP in 2001, and Biswanath Banerjee of RSP in 1996. Sankar Das Paul of Congress defeated Ipsita Gupta of RSP in 1991. Debabrata Bandopadhyay of RSP defeated Sankar Das Paul of Congress in 1987 and 1982, and Subrata Saha of Congress in 1977.

1951–1972
Sankar Das Paul of Congress won in 1972 and 1971. Sanat Kumar Raha of CPI won in 1969. S. Bhattacharya of Congress won in 1967. Sanat Kumar Raha of CPI won in 1962. Bejoy Kumar Ghosh of Congress won in 1957 and in independent India's first election in 1951.

References

Assembly constituencies of West Bengal
Politics of Murshidabad district
Berhampore